Laurie Graham is a Canadian downhill skier who represented Canada at the 1980, 1984 and 1988 Winter Olympics.

Laurie Graham may also refer to:

 Laurie Graham (novelist) (born 1947), journalist, scriptwriter and novelist
 Laurie Graham (politician) (born 1945), Australian politician